Ireland competed at the 1948 Summer Olympics in London, England. It was the first time that the country had competed in the Summer Olympics since 1932. A dispute between rival Irish Athletics governing bodies saw many Irish athletes barred from taking part in the Athletics competitions. 72 competitors, 68 men and 4 women, took part in 32 events in 9 sports.

Athletics

Basketball

Ireland made their only Olympic basketball appearance to date, losing all five of their games and finishing last of 23 teams.

Boxing

Equestrian

Fencing

Five fencers, four men and one woman, represented Ireland in 1948.

Men's foil
 Nick Thuillier
 Owen Tuohy
 Tom Smith

Men's team foil
 Owen Tuohy, Patrick Duffy, Tom Smith, Nick Thuillier

Women's foil
 Dorothy Dermody

Football

Rowing

Ireland had nine male rowers participate in one out of seven rowing events in 1948.

 Men's eight
 Paddy Dooley
 Robin Tamplin
 Paddy Harold
 Barry McDonnell
 Danny Taylor
 Joe Hanly
 Morgan McElligott
 Tom Dowdall
 Denis Sugrue (cox)

Sailing

Art competitions

References

Nations at the 1948 Summer Olympics
1948
1948 in Irish sport